Santiago Luis Copello (7 January 1880 – 9 February 1967) was an Argentine Cardinal of the Roman Catholic Church. He served as Archbishop of Buenos Aires from 1932 to 1959, and was elevated to the cardinalate in 1935. Copello served as the first Argentine cardinal and the first cardinal from Hispanic America.

Biography
Born in San Isidro, Buenos Aires, Copello studied at the seminary in La Plata and the Pontifical Gregorian University in Rome before being ordained to the priesthood on 28 October 1902. He then did pastoral work in La Plata from 1903 to 1918.

On 8 November 1918, Copello was appointed Auxiliary Bishop of La Plata and Titular Bishop of Aulon. He received his episcopal consecration on 30 March 1919, from Bishop Juan Terrero y Escalada, with Bishops Francisco Alberti and José Orzali serving as co-consecrators. After becoming Auxiliary Bishop of Buenos Aires on 15 May 1928, Copello was named Vicar General of the same see and Vicar of the Argentine Military Ordinariate on the following June 12. He was elected Vicar Capitular on 2 August 1932, and was appointed Archbishop of Buenos Aires on 20 September of that year.

Pope Pius XI created Copello Cardinal-Priest of San Girolamo dei Croati in the consistory of 16 December 1935, making him the first cardinal from Argentina and Spanish America. Raised to the rank of Primate of the Church in Argentina on 29 January 1936, Copello was one of the cardinal electors in the 1939 papal conclave that selected Pope Pius XII. In November 1945, he prohibited Argentine Catholics from supporting parties or candidates who promoted the separation of Church and State, removing religion from public schools, or legalizing civil divorce in the February 1946 elections. Copello even had a parish priest removed from his position for criticizing President Juan Perón. After attending the first general conference of the Latin American Episcopal Conference in 1955, he was temporarily forced to take up residence in the Roman Curia as a consequence of the Peronist regime's fall.

Cardinal Copello participated in the conclave of 1958, which resulted in the election of Pope John XXIII. He resigned, after twenty-six years of service, as Buenos Aires' archbishop on 25 March 1959, and was appointed Apostolic Chancellor on the same date (remaining in that post until his death). Copello thus became Cardinal-Priest of San Lorenzo in Damaso on 14 December 1959. From 1962 to 1965, he attended the Second Vatican Council, during the course of which he served as a cardinal elector in the 1963 papal conclave that selected Pope Paul VI.

Copello died in Rome, at age 87. He is buried in the Basilica of the Holy Sacrament, located behind the Kavanagh Building in the Retiro section of Buenos Aires.

References

External links
Catholic-Hierarchy

1880 births
1967 deaths
Argentine people of Italian descent
Pontifical Gregorian University alumni
Argentine cardinals
Roman Catholic archbishops of Buenos Aires
Participants in the Second Vatican Council
20th-century Roman Catholic archbishops in Argentina
Burials at Buenos Aires Metropolitan Cathedral
Roman Catholic bishops of Buenos Aires
Roman Catholic bishops of La Plata in Argentina